The 1979–80 season was Chelsea Football Club's sixty-sixth competitive season.

Table

References

External links
 1979–80 season at stamford-bridge.com

1979–80
English football clubs 1979–80 season